Chloroclystis eichhorni is a moth in the  family Geometridae. It is found in New Ireland.

References

Moths described in 1958
Chloroclystis
Moths of Papua New Guinea